The Colima warbler (Leiothlypis crissalis) is a New World warbler. It is mainly found in the Sierra Madre Occidental and Oriental mountains of central Mexico, though its range just barely extends into adjacent southwestern Texas in the Chisos Mountains of Big Bend National Park.

They are mainly dark gray and brownish in coloration, with a pale underside. Their rump and the feathers below their tail are yellow. They have a white ring around their eye and a tinge of pale color on their breasts. Males have a spot of orange on the top of their heads.

In appearance, the Colima warbler is very similar to Virginia's warbler, but is larger in size, more robust, and heavier billed. Virginia's warbler has much more yellow or pale color on their breasts, which is grayer in the Colima warbler. The yellow above and below the tail is also more orange-yellow than the Colima warbler, and more greenish-yellow in Virginia's warblers.

Life history

Nesting is done on the ground. Forming a loose cup-shaped nest of grass, leaves, and moss the Colima warbler hides its nest among the mountain rocks. It usually lays four eggs, which are white to cream-colored and speckled with brown.

References

External links
Guide to North American Birds: Colima warbler on Audubon Society website

Leiothlypis
Birds of Mexico
Birds of the Rio Grande valleys
Birds of the Sierra Madre Oriental
Birds of the Sierra Madre Occidental
Birds of the Sierra Madre del Sur
Birds of the Trans-Mexican Volcanic Belt
Colima warbler
Colima warbler
Colima warbler